The Orangeville Northmen are Junior "B" box lacrosse team from Orangeville, Ontario, Canada.  The Northmen play in the OLA Junior B Lacrosse League.

History

The Junior "B" Northmen were formed in 2001; they are the farm team for the Junior "A" Orangeville Northmen.

2001 - 2015: Since their first season, the Northmen have done quite well, failing to reach the playoffs only once.  In the 2006 Playoffs they made the finals.  Both the Northmen and their finals opponent, the Oakville Buzz, were founded in 2001.  To make the finals, Orangeville beat the Wallaceburg Red Devils 3 games to 0, the St. Catharines Spartans 3 games to 1, and the Niagara Thunderhawks 3 games to 2.  The Buzz dispatched the Northmen 3 games to 1 and ended up defeating the Windsor AKO Fratmen in the one-game final for the Founders Cup, 10-4 to win the National Junior "B" title.

2016: The Jr. B Northmen win the J. A. MacDonald Trophy, beating the Clarington Green Gaels 3 games to 0 in the Finals.  The Northmen topped Owen Sound, Six Nations and Windsor respectively in the first 3 rounds of the playoffs.  Orangeville played host to the 2016 Founders' Cup; both Orangeville and Clarington represented Ontario in the tournament which ran from August 16, 2016 through August 21, 2016.  Orangeville would go on to win the Founders' Cup, defeating Clarington 11-6 in the Championship Game.  This is Orangeville's first Founders' Cup since the team's return to Jr. B back in 2001.

2017: Back to back League Championships for the Jr. B Northmen, beating the Clarington Green Gaels 3 games to 2 in what could be considered an 'epic series' in Jr. B Finals history. The first three games of the series went to Overtime, seeing the home team win each overtime contest on their home floor.  However, in games four and five the Northmen would find their scoring touch, notching 13 goals in each game and outscoring the Gaels 26-13 (in total) en route to their second straight Championship.  The Northmen went on to defend their Founders' Cup Championship, winning Gold in Saskatoon, SK.

Season-by-season results
Note: GP = Games played, W = Wins, L = Losses, T = Ties, Pts = Points, GF = Goals for, GA = Goals against

Founders Cup
CANADIAN NATIONAL CHAMPIONSHIPS

External links
Orangeville Jr. B Northmen

Ontario Lacrosse Association teams
Sport in Orangeville, Ontario